= Usual market requirements =

The usual market requirements (UMR) of a country are a measure of its import requirement met through commercial purchases. It is usually defined as a five-year average.

== Agricultural policy ==
The UMR is used to determine whether concessional sales (e.g., under Title I of P.L. 480) will adversely affect normal commercial agricultural trade.
